

Events

Pre-1600
69 – Otho seizes power in Rome, proclaiming himself Emperor of Rome, beginning a reign of only three months.
1541 – King Francis I of France gives Jean-François Roberval a commission to settle the province of New France (Canada) and provide for the spread of the "Holy Catholic faith".
1559 – Elizabeth I is crowned Queen of England and Ireland in Westminster Abbey, London.
1582 – Truce of Yam-Zapolsky: Russia cedes Livonia to the Polish–Lithuanian Commonwealth.

1601–1900
1759 – The British Museum opens to the public.
1777 – American Revolutionary War: New Connecticut (present-day Vermont) declares its independence.
1782 – Superintendent of Finance Robert Morris addresses the U.S. Congress to recommend establishment of a national mint and decimal coinage.
1815 – War of 1812: American frigate , commanded by Commodore Stephen Decatur, is captured by a squadron of four British frigates.
1818 – A paper by David Brewster is read to the Royal Society, belatedly announcing his discovery of what we now call the biaxial class of doubly-refracting crystals. On the same day, Augustin-Jean Fresnel signs a "supplement" (submitted four days later) on reflection of polarized light.
1822 – Greek War of Independence: Demetrios Ypsilantis is elected president of the legislative assembly.
1865 – American Civil War: Fort Fisher in North Carolina falls to the Union, thus cutting off the last major seaport of the Confederacy.
1867 – Forty people die when ice covering the boating lake at Regent's Park, London, collapses.
1870 – A political cartoon for the first time symbolizes the Democratic Party with a donkey ("A Live Jackass Kicking a Dead Lion" by Thomas Nast for Harper's Weekly).
1876 – The first newspaper in Afrikaans, Die Afrikaanse Patriot, is published in Paarl.
1889 – The Coca-Cola Company, then known as the Pemberton Medicine Company, is incorporated in Atlanta.
1892 – James Naismith publishes the rules of basketball.

1901–present
1908 – The Alpha Kappa Alpha sorority becomes the first Greek-letter organization founded and established by African American college women.
1911 – Palestinian Arabic-language Falastin newspaper founded.
1919 – Rosa Luxemburg and Karl Liebknecht, two of the most prominent socialists in Germany, are tortured and murdered by the Freikorps at the end of the Spartacist uprising.
  1919   – Great Molasses Flood: A wave of molasses released from an exploding storage tank sweeps through Boston, Massachusetts, killing 21 and injuring 150.
1934 – The 8.0  Nepal–Bihar earthquake strikes Nepal and Bihar with a maximum Mercalli intensity of XI (Extreme), killing an estimated 6,000–10,700 people.
1936 – The first building to be completely covered in glass, built for the Owens-Illinois Glass Company, is completed in Toledo, Ohio.
1937 – Spanish Civil War: Nationalists and Republicans both withdraw after suffering heavy losses, ending the Second Battle of the Corunna Road.
1943 – World War II: The Soviet counter-offensive at Voronezh begins.
  1943   – The Pentagon is dedicated in Arlington County, Virginia.
1947 – The Black Dahlia murder: The dismembered corpse of Elizabeth Short was found in Los Angeles.
1949 – Chinese Civil War: The Communist forces take over Tianjin from the Nationalist government.
1962 – The Derveni papyrus, Europe's oldest surviving manuscript dating to 340 BC, is found in northern Greece.
  1962   – Netherlands New Guinea Conflict: Indonesian Navy fast patrol boat RI Macan Tutul commanded by Commodore Yos Sudarso sunk in Arafura Sea by the Dutch Navy.
1966 – The First Nigerian Republic, led by Abubakar Tafawa Balewa is overthrown in a military coup d'état.
1967 – The first Super Bowl is played in Los Angeles. The Green Bay Packers defeat the Kansas City Chiefs 35–10.
1969 – The Soviet Union launches Soyuz 5.
1970 – Nigerian Civil War: Biafran rebels surrender following an unsuccessful 32-month fight for independence from Nigeria.
  1970   – Muammar Gaddafi is proclaimed premier of Libya.
1973 – Vietnam War: Citing progress in peace negotiations, President Richard Nixon announces the suspension of offensive action in North Vietnam.
1975 – The Alvor Agreement is signed, ending the Angolan War of Independence and giving Angola independence from Portugal.
1976 – Gerald Ford's would-be assassin, Sara Jane Moore, is sentenced to life in prison.
1977 – Linjeflyg Flight 618 crashes in Kälvesta near Stockholm Bromma Airport in Stockholm, Sweden, killing 22 people.
1981 – Pope John Paul II receives a delegation from the Polish trade union Solidarity at the Vatican led by Lech Wałęsa.
1991 – The United Nations deadline for the withdrawal of Iraqi forces from occupied Kuwait expires, preparing the way for the start of Operation Desert Storm.
  1991   – Elizabeth II, in her capacity as Queen of Australia, signs letters patent allowing Australia to become the first Commonwealth realm to institute its own Victoria Cross in its honours system.
2001 – Wikipedia, a free wiki content encyclopedia, is launched.
2005 – ESA's SMART-1 lunar orbiter discovers elements such as calcium, aluminum, silicon, iron, and other surface elements on the Moon.
2009 – US Airways Flight 1549 ditches safely in the Hudson River after the plane collides with birds less than two minutes after take-off. This becomes known as "The Miracle on the Hudson" as all 155 people on board were rescued.
2013 – A train carrying Egyptian Army recruits derails near Giza, Greater Cairo, killing 19 and injuring 120 others.
2015 – The Swiss National Bank abandons the cap on the Swiss franc's value relative to the euro, causing turmoil in international financial markets.
2016 – The Kenyan Army suffers its worst defeat ever in a battle with Al-Shabaab Islamic insurgents in El-Adde, Somalia. An estimated 150 Kenyan soldiers are killed in the battle.
2018 – British multinational construction and facilities management services company Carillion went into liquidationofficially, "the largest ever trading liquidation in the UK"
2019 – Somali militants attack the DusitD2 hotel in Nairobi, Kenya killing at least 21 people and injuring 19.
  2019   – Theresa May's UK government suffers the biggest government defeat in modern times, when 432 MPs voting against the proposed European Union withdrawal agreement, giving her opponents a majority of 230.
  2020   – The Japanese Ministry of Health, Labour and Welfare confirms the first case of COVID-19 in Japan.
2021 – A 6.2-magnitude earthquake strikes Indonesia's Sulawesi island killing at least 105 and injuring 3,369 people.
2022 – The Hunga Tonga-Hunga Haʻapai volcano erupts, cutting off communications with Tonga and causing a tsunami across the Pacific.
2023 – Yeti Airlines Flight 691 crashes near Pokhara International Airport, of the 72 people on board, no one is believed to have survived.

Births

Pre-1600
1432 – Afonso V of Portugal (d. 1481)
1462 – Edzard I, Count of East Frisia, German noble (d. 1528)
1481 – Ashikaga Yoshizumi, Japanese shōgun (d. 1511)
1538 – Maeda Toshiie, Japanese general (d. 1599)
1595 – Henry Carey, 2nd Earl of Monmouth, English politician (d. 1661)

1601–1900
1622 – Molière, French actor and playwright (d. 1673)
1623 – Algernon Sidney, British philosopher (probable) (d. 1683)
1671 – Abraham de la Pryme, English archaeologist and historian (d. 1704)
1716 – Philip Livingston, American merchant and politician (d. 1778)
1747 – John Aikin, English surgeon and author (d. 1822)
1754 – Richard Martin, Irish activist and politician, co-founded the Royal Society for the Prevention of Cruelty to Animals (d. 1834)
1791 – Franz Grillparzer, Austrian author, poet, and playwright (d. 1872)
1795 – Alexander Griboyedov, Russian playwright, composer, and poet (d. 1829)
1803 – Marjorie Fleming, Scottish poet and author (d. 1811)
1809 – Pierre-Joseph Proudhon, French economist and politician (d. 1865)
1812 – Peter Christen Asbjørnsen, Norwegian author and scholar (d. 1885)
1815 – William Bickerton, English-American religious leader, third President of the Church of Jesus Christ (d. 1905)
1834 – Samuel Arza Davenport, American lawyer and politician (d. 1911)
1841 – Frederick Stanley, 16th Earl of Derby, English captain and politician, sixth Governor General of Canada (d. 1908)
1842 – Josef Breuer, Austrian physician and psychiatrist (d. 1925)
  1842   – Mary MacKillop, Australian nun and saint, co-founded the Sisters of St Joseph of the Sacred Heart (d. 1909)
1850 – Leonard Darwin, English soldier, eugenicist, and politician (d. 1943)
  1850   – Mihai Eminescu, Romanian journalist, author, and poet (d. 1889)
  1850   – Sofia Kovalevskaya, Russian-Swedish mathematician and physicist (d. 1891)
1855 – Jacques Damala, Greek-French soldier and actor (d. 1889)
1858 – Giovanni Segantini, Italian painter (d. 1899)
1859 – Archibald Peake, English-Australian politician, 25th Premier of South Australia (d. 1920)
1863 – Wilhelm Marx, German lawyer and politician, 17th Chancellor of Germany (d. 1946)
1866 – Nathan Söderblom, Swedish archbishop, historian, and academic, Nobel Prize laureate (d. 1931)
1869 – Ruby Laffoon, American lawyer and politician, 43rd Governor of Kentucky (d. 1941)
  1869   – Stanisław Wyspiański, Polish poet, playwright, and painter (d. 1907)
1870 – Pierre S. du Pont, American businessman and philanthropist (d. 1954)
1872 – Arsen Kotsoyev, Russian author and translator (d. 1944)
1875 – Thomas Burke, American sprinter, coach, and journalist (d. 1929)
1877 – Lewis Terman, American psychologist, eugenicist, and academic (d. 1956)
1878 – Johanna Müller-Hermann, Austrian composer (d. 1941)
1879 – Mazo de la Roche, Canadian author and playwright (d. 1961)
1882 – Henry Burr, Canadian singer, radio performer, and producer (d. 1941)
  1882   – Princess Margaret of Connaught (d. 1920)
1885 – Lorenz Böhler, Austrian physician and author (d. 1973)
  1885   – Grover Lowdermilk, American baseball player (d. 1968)
1890 – Michiaki Kamada, Japanese admiral (d. 1947)
1891 – Ray Chapman, American baseball player (d. 1920)
1893 – Ivor Novello, Welsh singer-songwriter and actor (d. 1951)
1895 – Artturi Ilmari Virtanen, Finnish chemist and academic, Nobel Prize laureate (d. 1973)
1896 – Marjorie Bennett, Australian-American actress (d. 1982)

1901–present
1902 – Nâzım Hikmet, Greek-Turkish author, poet, and playwright (d. 1963)
  1902   – Saud of Saudi Arabia (d. 1969)
1903 – Paul A. Dever, American lieutenant and politician, 58th Governor of Massachusetts (d. 1958)
1907 – Janusz Kusociński, Polish runner and soldier (d. 1940)
1908 – Edward Teller, Hungarian-American physicist and academic (d. 2003)
1909 – Jean Bugatti, German-French engineer (d. 1939)
  1909   – Gene Krupa, American drummer, composer, and actor (d. 1973)
1912 – Michel Debré, French lawyer and politician, Prime Minister of France (d. 1996)
1913 – Eugène Brands, Dutch painter (d. 2002)
  1913   – Lloyd Bridges, American actor (d. 1998)
  1913   – Miriam Hyde, Australian pianist and composer (d. 2005)
  1913   – Alexander Marinesko, Ukrainian-Russian lieutenant (d. 1963)
1914 – Stefan Bałuk, Polish general (d. 2014)
  1914   – Hugh Trevor-Roper, English historian and academic (d. 2003)
1917 – K. A. Thangavelu, Indian film actor and comedian (d. 1994)
1918 – João Figueiredo, Brazilian general and politician, 30th President of Brazil (d. 1999)
  1918   – Édouard Gagnon, Canadian cardinal (d. 2007)
  1918   – Gamal Abdel Nasser, Egyptian colonel and politician, second President of Egypt (d. 1970)
1919 – Maurice Herzog, French mountaineer and politician, French Minister of Youth Affairs and Sports (d. 2012)
  1919   – George Cadle Price, Belizean politician, first Prime Minister of Belize (d. 2011)
1920 – Bob Davies, American basketball player and coach (d. 1990)
  1920   – Steve Gromek, American baseball player (d. 2002)
  1920   – John O'Connor, American cardinal (d. 2000)
1921 – Babasaheb Bhosale, Indian lawyer and politician, eighth Chief Minister of Maharashtra (d. 2007)
  1921   – Frank Thornton, English actor (d. 2013)
1922 – Sylvia Lawler, English geneticist (d. 1996)
  1922   – Eric Willis, Australian sergeant and politician, 34th Premier of New South Wales (d. 1999)
1923 – Ivor Cutler, Scottish pianist, songwriter, and poet (d. 2006)
  1923   – Lee Teng-hui, Taiwanese economist and politician, fourth President of the Republic of China (d. 2020)
1924 – George Lowe, New Zealand-English mountaineer and explorer (d. 2013)
1925 – Ruth Slenczynska, American pianist and composer
  1925   – Ignacio López Tarso, Mexican actor (d. 2023)
1926 – Maria Schell, Austrian-Swiss actress (d. 2005)
1927 – Phyllis Coates, American actress
1928 – W. R. Mitchell, English journalist and author (d. 2015)
1929 – Earl Hooker, American guitarist (d. 1970)
  1929   – Martin Luther King Jr., American minister and activist, Nobel Prize laureate (d. 1968)
1930 – Eddie Graham, American professional wrestler and promoter (d. 1985)
1931 – Lee Bontecou, American painter and sculptor (d. 2022)
1932 – Lou Jones, American sprinter (d. 2006)
1933 – Frank Bough, English journalist and radio host (d. 2020)
  1933   – Ernest J. Gaines, American author and academic (d. 2019)
  1933   – Peter Maitlis, English chemist and academic (d. 2022)
1934 – V. S. Ramadevi, Indian civil servant and politician, 13th Governor of Karnataka (d. 2013)
1937 – Margaret O'Brien, American actress and singer
1938 – Ashraf Aman, Pakistani engineer and mountaineer
  1938   – Estrella Blanca, Mexican wrestler
  1938   – Chuni Goswami, Indian footballer and cricketer (d. 2020)
1939 – Per Ahlmark, Swedish journalist and politician, first Deputy Prime Minister of Sweden (d. 2018)
  1939   – Tony Bullimore, British sailor (d. 2018)
1941 – Captain Beefheart, American singer-songwriter, musician, and artist (d. 2010)
1942 – Frank Joseph Polozola, American academic and judge (d. 2013)
1943 – George Ambrum, Australian rugby league player (d. 1986)
  1943   – Margaret Beckett, English metallurgist and politician, Secretary of State for Foreign and Commonwealth Affairs
  1943   – Stuart E. Eizenstat, American lawyer and diplomat, United States Ambassador to the European Union
  1943   – Mike Marshall, American baseball player (d. 2021)
1944 – Jenny Nimmo, English author
1945 – Ko Chun-hsiung, Taiwanese actor, director, and politician (d. 2015)
  1945   – Vince Foster, American lawyer and political figure (d. 1993)
  1945   – William R. Higgins, American colonel (d. 1990)
  1945   – Princess Michael of Kent
  1945   – David Pleat, English footballer, manager, and sportscaster
1946 – Charles Brown, American actor (d. 2004)
1947 – Mary Hogg, English lawyer and judge
  1947   – Andrea Martin, American-Canadian actress, singer, and screenwriter
1948 – Ronnie Van Zant, American singer-songwriter (d. 1977)
1949 – Luis Alvarado, Puerto Rican-American baseball player (d. 2001)
  1949   – Alasdair Liddell, English businessman (d. 2012)
  1949   – Ian Stewart, Scottish runner
  1949   – Howard Twitty, American golfer
1950 – Marius Trésor, French footballer and coach
1952 – Boris Blank, Swiss singer-songwriter
  1952   – Andrzej Fischer, Polish footballer
  1952   – Muhammad Wakkas, Bangladeshi teacher and parliamentarian (d. 2021)
1953 – Randy White, American football player
1954 – Jose Dalisay, Jr., Filipino poet, author, and screenwriter
1955 – Nigel Benson, English author and illustrator
  1955   – Andreas Gursky, German photographer
  1955   – Khalid Islambouli, Egyptian lieutenant (d. 1982)
1956 – Vitaly Kaloyev, Russian architect
  1956   – Mayawati, Indian educator and politician, 23rd Chief Minister of Uttar Pradesh
  1956   – Marc Trestman, American football player and coach
1957 – David Ige, American politician
  1957   – Marty Lyons, American football player and sportscaster
  1957   – Andrew Tyrie, English journalist and politician
  1957   – Mario Van Peebles, Mexican-American actor and director
1958 – Ken Judge, Australian footballer and coach (d. 2016)
  1958   – Boris Tadić, Serbian psychologist and politician, 16th President of Serbia
1959 – Greg Dowling, Australian rugby league player
  1959   – Pavle Kozjek, Slovenian mountaineer and photographer (d. 2008)
1961 – Serhiy N. Morozov, Ukrainian footballer and coach
  1961   – Yves Pelletier, Canadian actor and director
1964 – Osmo Tapio Räihälä, Finnish composer
1965 – Maurizio Fondriest, Italian cyclist
  1965   – Bernard Hopkins, American boxer and coach
  1965   – James Nesbitt, Northern Irish actor
1967 – Ted Tryba, American golfer
1968 – Chad Lowe, American actor, director, and producer
1969 – Delino DeShields, American baseball player and manager
1970 – Shane McMahon, American wrestler and businessman
1971 – Regina King, American actress
1972 – Shelia Burrell, American heptathlete
  1972   – Christos Kostis, Greek footballer
  1972   – Claudia Winkleman, English journalist and critic
1973 – Essam El Hadary, Egyptian footballer
1974 – Séverine Deneulin, international development academic
1975 – Mary Pierce, Canadian-American tennis player and coach
1976 – Doug Gottlieb, American basketball player and sportscaster
  1976   – Iryna Lishchynska, Ukrainian runner
  1976   – Scott Murray, Scottish rugby player
  1976   – Florentin Petre, Romanian footballer and manager
1978 – Eddie Cahill, American actor
  1978   – Franco Pellizotti, Italian cyclist
  1978   – Ryan Sidebottom, English cricketer
1979 – Drew Brees, American football player
  1979   – Michalis Morfis, Cypriot footballer
  1979   – Martin Petrov, Bulgarian footballer
1980 – Matt Holliday, American baseball player
1981 – Pitbull, American rapper and producer
  1981   – Dylan Armstrong, Canadian shot putter and hammer thrower
  1981   – Vanessa Henke, German tennis player
1982 – Francis Zé, Cameroonian footballer
1983 – Hugo Viana, Portuguese footballer
1984 – Ben Shapiro, American author and commentator
1985 – René Adler, German footballer
  1985   – Enrico Patrizio, Italian rugby player
  1985   – Kenneth Emil Petersen, Danish footballer
1986 – Fred Davis, American football player
1987 – Greg Inglis, Australian rugby league player
  1987   – Tsegaye Kebede, Ethiopian runner
  1987   – David Knight, English footballer
  1987   – Kelleigh Ryan, Canadian fencer
1988 – Daniel Caligiuri, German footballer
  1988   – Skrillex, American DJ and producer
1989 – Alexei Cherepanov, Russian ice hockey player (d. 2008)
  1989   – Nicole Ross, American Olympic foil fencer
1990 – Robert Trznadel, Polish footballer
1991 – Marc Bartra, Spanish footballer
  1991   – Nicolai Jørgensen, Danish footballer
  1991   – Darya Klishina, Russian long jumper
  1991   – James Mitchell, Australian basketball player
1992 – Joël Veltman, Dutch footballer
1993 – Kadeem Allen, American basketball player
1996 – Dove Cameron, American actress and singer
  1996   – Deebo Samuel, American football player
1998 – Alexandra Eade, Australian artistic gymnast
2004 – Grace VanderWaal, American singer-songwriter

Deaths

Pre-1600
69 – Galba, Roman emperor (b. 3 BC)
 378 – Chak Tok Ich'aak I, Mayan ruler
 570 – Íte of Killeedy, Irish nun and saint (b. 475)
 849 – Theophylact, Byzantine emperor (b. 793)
 936 – Rudolph of France (b. 880)
 950 – Wang Jingchong, Chinese general
1149 – Berengaria of Barcelona, queen consort of Castile (b. 1116)
1568 – Nicolaus Olahus, Romanian archbishop (b. 1493)
1569 – Catherine Carey, lady-in-waiting to Elizabeth I of England (b. 1524)
1584 – Martha Leijonhufvud, Swedish noblewoman (b. 1520)

1601–1900
1623 – Paolo Sarpi, Italian lawyer, historian, and scholar (b. 1552)
1672 – John Cosin, English bishop and academic (b. 1594)
1683 – Philip Warwick, English politician (b. 1609)
1775 – Giovanni Battista Sammartini, Italian organist and composer (b. 1700)
1783 -  Lord Stirling, American Revolutionary War Major General (b. 1726)
1790 – John Landen, English mathematician and theorist (b. 1719)
1804 – Dru Drury, English entomologist and author (b. 1725)
1813 – Anton Bernolák, Slovak linguist and priest (b. 1762)
1815 – Emma, Lady Hamilton, English-French mistress of Horatio Nelson, 1st Viscount Nelson (b. 1761)
1855 – Henri Braconnot, French chemist and pharmacist (b. 1780)
1864 – Isaac Nathan, English-Australian composer and journalist (b. 1792) 
1866 – Massimo d'Azeglio, Piedmontese-Italian statesman, novelist and painter (b. 1798)
1876 – Eliza McCardle Johnson, American wife of Andrew Johnson, 18th First Lady of the United States (b. 1810)
1880 – Carl Georg von Wächter, German jurist (b. 1797)
1893 – Fanny Kemble, English actress (b. 1809)
1896 – Mathew Brady, American photographer and journalist (b. 1822)

1901–present
1905 – George Thorn, Australian politician, sixth Premier of Queensland (b. 1838)
1909 – Arnold Janssen, German priest and missionary (b. 1837)
1916 – Modest Ilyich Tchaikovsky, Russian playwright and translator (b. 1850)
1919 – Karl Liebknecht, German politician (b. 1871)
  1919   – Rosa Luxemburg, German economist, theorist, and philosopher (b. 1871)
1926 – Enrico Toselli, Italian pianist and composer (b. 1883)
1929 – George Cope, American painter (b. 1855)
1936 – Henry Forster, 1st Baron Forster, English cricketer and politician, seventh Governor-General of Australia (b. 1866)
1937 – Anton Holban, Romanian author, theoretician, and educator (b. 1902)
1939 – Kullervo Manner, Finnish Speaker of the Parliament, the Prime Minister of the FSWR and the Supreme Commander of the Red Guards (b. 1880)
1945 – Wilhelm Wirtinger, Austrian-German mathematician and theorist (b. 1865)
1948 – Josephus Daniels, American publisher and diplomat, 41st United States Secretary of the Navy (b. 1862)
1950 – Henry H. Arnold, American general (b. 1886)
1951 – Ernest Swinton, British Army officer (b. 1868)
  1951   – Nikolai Vekšin, Estonian-Russian captain and sailor (b. 1887)
1952 – Ned Hanlon, Australian sergeant and politician, 26th Premier of Queensland (b. 1887)
1955 – Yves Tanguy, French-American painter (b. 1900)
1959 – Regina Margareten, Hungarian businesswoman (b. 1863)
1964 – Jack Teagarden, American singer-songwriter and trombonist (b. 1905)
1967 – David Burliuk, Ukrainian author and illustrator (b. 1882)
1968 – Bill Masterton, Canadian-American ice hockey player (b. 1938)
1970 – Frank Clement, English race car driver (b. 1886)
  1970   – William T. Piper, American engineer and businessman, founded Piper Aircraft (b. 1881)
1972 – Daisy Ashford, English author (b. 1881)
1973 – Coleman Francis, American actor, director, and producer (b. 1919)
  1973   – Ivan Petrovsky, Russian mathematician and academic (b. 1901)
1974 – Harold D. Cooley, American lawyer and politician (b. 1897)
1981 – Graham Whitehead, English race car driver (b. 1922)
1982 – Red Smith, American journalist (b. 1905)
1983 – Armin Öpik, Estonian-Australian paleontologist and geologist (b. 1898)
  1983   – Shepperd Strudwick, American actor (b. 1907)
1984 – Fazıl Küçük, Cypriot journalist and politician (b. 1906)
1987 – Ray Bolger, American actor, singer, and dancer (b. 1904)
1988 – Seán MacBride, Irish republican activist and politician, Minister for External Affairs, Nobel Prize laureate (b. 1904)
1990 – Gordon Jackson, Scottish-English actor (b. 1923)
  1990   – Peggy van Praagh, English ballerina, choreographer, and director (b. 1910)
1993 – Sammy Cahn, American songwriter (b. 1913)
1994 – Georges Cziffra, Hungarian-French pianist and composer (b. 1921)
  1994   – Harry Nilsson, American singer-songwriter (b. 1941)
  1994   – Harilal Upadhyay, Indian author, poet, and astrologist (b. 1916)
1996 – Les Baxter, American pianist and composer (b. 1922)
  1996   – Moshoeshoe II of Lesotho (b. 1938)
1998 – Gulzarilal Nanda, Indian economist and politician, Prime Minister of India (b. 1898)
1998 – Junior Wells, American singer-songwriter and harmonica player (b. 1934)
1999 – Betty Box, English film producer (b. 1915)
2000 – Georges-Henri Lévesque, Canadian-Dominican priest and sociologist (b. 1903)
2001 – Leo Marks, English cryptographer, playwright, and screenwriter (b. 1920)
2002 – Michael Anthony Bilandic, American politician, 49th Mayor of Chicago (b. 1923)
  2002   – Eugène Brands, Dutch painter (b. 1913)
2003 – Doris Fisher, American singer-songwriter (b. 1915)
2004 – Olivia Goldsmith, American author (b. 1949)
2005 – Victoria de los Ángeles, Spanish soprano and actress (b. 1923)
  2005   – Walter Ernsting, German author (b. 1920)
  2005   – Elizabeth Janeway, American author and critic (b. 1913)
  2005   – Ruth Warrick, American actress (b. 1916)
2006 – Jaber Al-Ahmad Al-Jaber Al-Sabah, Kuwaiti ruler (b. 1926)
2007 – Awad Hamed al-Bandar, Iraqi lawyer and judge (b. 1945)
  2007   – Barzan Ibrahim al-Tikriti, Iraqi intelligence officer (b. 1951)
  2007   – James Hillier, Canadian-American computer scientist and academic, co-invented the electron microscope (b. 1915)
  2007   – Pura Santillan-Castrence, Filipino educator and diplomat (b. 1905)
  2007   – Bo Yibo, Chinese commander and politician, Vice Premier of the People's Republic of China (b. 1908)
2008 – Robert V. Bruce, American historian, author, and academic (b. 1923)
  2008   – Brad Renfro, American actor (b. 1982)
2009 – Lincoln Verduga Loor, Ecuadorian journalist and politician (b. 1917)
2011 – Nat Lofthouse, English footballer and manager (b. 1925)
  2011   – Pierre Louis-Dreyfus, French soldier, race car driver, and businessman (b. 1908)
  2011   – Susannah York, English actress and activist (b. 1939)
2012 – Ed Derwinski, American soldier and politician, first United States Secretary of Veterans Affairs (b. 1926)
  2012   – Manuel Fraga Iribarne, Spanish lawyer and politician, third President of the Xunta of Galicia (b. 1922)
  2012   – Carlo Fruttero, Italian journalist and author (b. 1926)
  2012   – Samuel Jaskilka, American general (b. 1919)
  2012   – Ib Spang Olsen, Danish author and illustrator (b. 1921)
  2012   – Hulett C. Smith, American lieutenant and politician, 27th Governor of West Virginia (b. 1918)
2013 – Nagisa Oshima, Japanese director and screenwriter (b. 1932)
  2013   – John Thomas, American high jumper (b. 1941)
2014 – Curtis Bray, American football player and coach (b. 1970)
  2014   – John Dobson, Chinese-American astronomer and author (b. 1915)
  2014   – Roger Lloyd-Pack, English actor (b. 1944)
2015 – Ervin Drake, American songwriter and composer (b. 1919)
  2015   – Kim Fowley, American singer-songwriter, producer, and manager (b. 1939)
  2015   – Ray Nagel, American football player and coach (b. 1927)
2016 – Francisco X. Alarcón, American poet and educator (b. 1954)
  2016   – Ken Judge, Australian footballer and coach (b. 1958)
  2016   – Manuel Velázquez, Spanish footballer (b. 1943)
2017 – Jimmy Snuka, Fijian professional wrestler (b. 1943)
2018 – Dolores O'Riordan, Irish pop singer (b. 1971)
2019 – Carol Channing, American actress (b. 1921)
  2019   – Ida Kleijnen, Dutch chef (b. 1936)
2020 – Rocky Johnson, Canadian professional wrestler (b. 1944)
  2020   – Lloyd Cowan, British athlete and coach (b. 1962)
2022 – Alexa McDonough, first female politician to lead a major provincial political party in Canada, former leader of the federal New Democratic Party. (b. 1944)

Holidays and observances
Arbor Day (Egypt)
Armed Forces Remembrance Day (Nigeria)
Army Day (India)
Christian feast day:
Abeluzius (Ethiopian Orthodox Tewahedo Church)
Arnold Janssen
Francis Ferdinand de Capillas (one of Martyr Saints of China)
Ita
Our Lady of the Poor
Macarius of Egypt (Western Christianity)
Maurus and Placidus (Order of Saint Benedict)
Paul the Hermit
January 15 (Eastern Orthodox liturgics)
Earliest day on which Martin Luther King Jr. Day can fall (the 15th being his birthday), while January 21 is the latest; celebrated on the third Monday in January. (United States)
Earliest day on which Sinulog Festival can fall, while January 21 is the latest; celebrated on the third Sunday in January. (Philippines)
John Chilembwe Day (Malawi)
Korean Alphabet Day (North Korea)
Ocean Duty Day (Indonesia])
Sagichō at Tsurugaoka Hachimangū. (Kamakura, Japan)
Teacher's Day (Venezuela)
Black Christ of Esquipulas day 
The second day of the sidereal winter solstice festivals in India (see January 14):
Thai Pongal, Tamil harvest festival

References

External links

 BBC: On This Day
 
 Historical Events on January 15

Days of the year
January